Marliéria is a municipality in the state of Minas Gerais in the Southeast region of Brazil.

The municipality contains part of the  Rio Doce State Park, created in 1944, the first state-level conservation unit in Minas Gerais.

See also
List of municipalities in Minas Gerais

References

Municipalities in Minas Gerais